Dominique Provost  (born 15 June 1961)  is a former French football player who played as Forward for French club  Football Club féminin condéen of the Division 1 Féminine.

References

1961 births
Living people
Footballers from Caen
French women's footballers
Division 1 Féminine players
Women's association football midfielders
France women's international footballers